The Thick of It is a British comedy television series that satirises the inner workings of British government. Written and directed by Armando Iannucci, it was first broadcast for two short series on BBC Four in 2005, initially with a small cast focusing on a government minister, his advisers and their party's spin-doctor. The cast was significantly expanded for two hour-long specials to coincide with Christmas and Gordon Brown's appointment as prime minister in 2007, which saw new characters forming the opposition party added to the cast. These characters continued when the show switched channels to BBC Two for its third series in 2009. A fourth series about a coalition government was broadcast in 2012, with the last episode transmitted on 27 October 2012.

The series has been described as the 21st century's answer to Yes Minister. It highlights the struggles and conflicts between politicians, party spin doctors, advisers, civil servants and the media. In similar fashion to Yes Minister, the political parties involved are never mentioned by name, and in series 1 and 2 most policies discussed are fairly generic and non-ideological. Iannucci describes it as "Yes Minister meets Larry Sanders". Journalist and former civil servant Martin Sixsmith was an adviser to the writing team, adding to the realism of some scenes. The series became well known for its profanity and for featuring storylines which have mirrored, or in some cases predicted, real-life policies, events or scandals.

A feature film spin-off, In the Loop, was released in the UK on 17 April 2009. A pilot for a U.S. remake of the show was not successful, but Iannucci was subsequently invited to create Veep for HBO, a programme with a very similar tone and political issues, with the involvement of some The Thick of It writers and production members.

Production

Background 
Armando Iannucci originally conceived of a modern political satire after "arguing the case" for Yes Minister in a 2004 Best British Sitcom poll for BBC Two. His idea was commissioned by Roly Keating, the controller of BBC Four, who granted Iannucci limited budget, telling him to "turn that into what you can." Iannucci created the first series of three episodes, which aired in May–June 2005, and a second series, also of three episodes, which followed in October.

Writing 
The series was written by a team of writers led by Armando Iannucci, who also directed the series, with Jesse Armstrong, Simon Blackwell, Roger Drew, Sean Gray, Ian Martin, Will Smith and Tony Roche. Some of the dialogue was improvised rather than scripted (with the cast credited as providing "additional material"), and included some very strong language. Peter Capaldi said "Fundamentally 80% of the final cut is the script that we started with. The improvisation just makes it feel more real and not written." Prior to rehearsals, the scripts were sent to a "swearing consultant" in Lancaster called Ian Martin, who added some of the more colourful language. The programme's producer was Adam Tandy, who had produced all of Iannucci's television projects since 2000. The programme was shot with hand-held cameras to give it a sense of vérité or fly-on-the-wall documentary. The documentary style was furthered by the absence of any incidental music or laughter track.

Plot 
The action centres on the fictional Department of Social Affairs and Citizenship ("DoSAC" – previously the Department of Social Affairs, or "DoSA", prior to the reshuffle of episode five), which supposedly came out of the prime minister's passing enthusiasm for "joined-up government". Thus it acts as a "super department" overseeing many others, with some similarities to the Cabinet Office. This concept enables different political themes to be dealt with in the programme, similar to the Department of Administrative Affairs in Yes Minister.

Hugh Abbot, played by Chris Langham, is a blundering minister heading the department, who is continually trying to do his job under the watchful eye of Malcolm Tucker (Peter Capaldi), Number 10's highly aggressive and domineering "enforcer". The programme also features James Smith as senior special adviser Glenn Cullen, Chris Addison as junior policy adviser Ollie Reeder, and Joanna Scanlan as civil service press secretary Terri Coverley.

The beginning of the third series saw Hugh Abbot replaced as head of DoSAC by Nicola Murray (Rebecca Front), who arrives without her own staff, so Ollie and Glenn find themselves keeping their jobs.

From series 4, after a general election which results in a coalition government, Peter Mannion MP (Roger Allam) is the new Secretary of State for DoSAC, supported by his team of special advisers, commanded by Number 10's director of communications Stewart Pearson (Vincent Franklin) and thwarted by his new coalition partner, DoSAC's junior minister Fergus Williams MP (Geoffrey Streatfeild). Nicola Murray MP is now leader of the opposition, and opposition spin doctor Malcolm Tucker is desperate for a return to power.

Episodes

Series 1 (2005) 
In the first batch of three episodes, Hugh Abbot is installed as a new minister following the forced resignation of his predecessor Cliff Lawton. These episodes follow his attempts to make his mark on the department by introducing new policies while toeing the party line enforced by Malcolm Tucker. Due to a series of complications and mistakes, this leads to the minister coming close to resignation on a number of occasions.

Series 2 (2005) 
The second batch of episodes takes place before a cabinet reshuffle, and follows Hugh's attempts to keep his job. Ollie Reeder is seconded to number 10 "to phone his girlfriend" Emma Messinger, a member of the shadow defence policy team, where he is under the close eye of enforcer Jamie. Meanwhile, Terri Coverley is on compassionate leave following the death of her father, leaving her role to Robyn Murdoch, a senior press officer. The department also has to contend with the interference of the prime minister's "blue skies" adviser Julius Nicholson. The minister and the department survive the reshuffle, with the department being rebranded as the "Department of Social Affairs and Citizenship" and moved to a new building. However, the mistakes and compromises continue.

Specials (2007) 
In the two specials, following the Christmas break, Hugh Abbot is in Australia and the department has to "babysit" junior minister for immigration Ben Swain, who is described as a "Nutter" (a term used for supporters of prime-minister-in-waiting Tom Davis). The first special ("Rise of the Nutters") revolves around a computer problem at Immigration, which is exacerbated by the junior minister appearing in a disastrous Newsnight interview. The opposition policy adviser, Emma Messinger, capitalises on the error by stealing an idea from her boyfriend, Ollie Reeder, to send the shadow minister Peter Mannion on a fact-finding mission at an immigration centre. Meanwhile, Tucker is concerned about his position in the government after speculating that the prime minister's handover to Tom Davis is expected in less than six months. Tucker conspires with Ollie to leak the prime minister's "legacy programme" (the PM's plan to move the handling of immigration policy to a non-political executive board) in the hope of stalling his departure, inadvertently leading the PM to resign early. The next episode ("Spinners and Losers") follows a single night of "spin", as advisers, junior politicians and enforcers all try to better their position during the transition, but only Malcolm gets anywhere.

Series 3 (2009) 
In series 3, Hugh Abbot is replaced as minister by Nicola Murray, played by Rebecca Front. She is an unexpected, last-minute choice for the position, and given her inexperience and lack of staff, she is forced to retain Ollie and Glenn as her advisers. The series continues to focus on the general running, or mis-running, of DoSAC, with Murray's attempts to formulate her "Fourth Sector Pathfinder Initiative" being a running thread throughout the series. With the cloud of the forthcoming general election and tension at 10 Downing Street looming, the series also broadens its scope to include episodes set at the annual party conference and BBC Radio 5 Live. We also see more of Murray's opposite number, Peter Mannion, and other members of the opposition first seen in the 2007 specials. The gradual breakdown of Malcolm Tucker and appearance of new threats to his control, in particular Steve Fleming (David Haig), are also major plotlines. The series ends with Fleming forcing Malcolm's resignation, only to be ousted himself a matter of days later. Having regained dominance, Malcolm decides to call an election immediately to seize the initiative from his enemies in the opposition and his own party.

Series 4 (2012) 
In series 4, the government and opposition have switched places following a hung election and there is therefore a coalition government with a smaller third party. Peter Mannion has been made the Secretary of State for Social Affairs and Citizenship but has to contend with Fergus Williams, his junior partner in the coalition. Meanwhile, following Tom Davis's defeat and resignation, Nicola Murray had been elected by her party, apparently on a technicality, over Dan Miller, her opponent, as leader of the opposition, although she resigns at the end of episode four and is replaced by her deputy, Miller. A running thread throughout the series is an ongoing "Leveson-style public inquiry" which takes place in episode six. While the first four episodes each focuses solely on one side (episodes one and three focusing on the coalition, and episode two and four focusing on the opposition), each episode thereafter cuts between the parties. The final three episodes of series four show all parties trying to cover their tracks regarding a public health care bill which has led to the public eviction and consequent suicide of Douglas Tickel, a nurse with a history of mental illness. All three main parties have some level of responsibility and have participated in the illegal leaking of documents, in particular Tickel's medical records, which is the reason for the Goolding Inquiry being launched.

Cast and characters 

Most episodes focus on the department's incumbent minister and a core cast of advisers and civil servants, under the watchful eye of Number 10's enforcer, Malcolm Tucker. Over its run, the series has developed a large cast of additional characters, who form the government, opposition, as well as members of the media.

 Malcolm Tucker (Peter Capaldi) – Series 1–4 – The aggressive, profane and feared director of communications for the government. He serves two main roles: acting as the prime minister's chief enforcer to ensure the cabinet ministers all follow the party line, and managing the government's crisis management PR, usually in the form of spin. He regularly uses smears or threats of violence to achieve his ends. Tucker also appears in In the Loop. The Guardian used the character in its coverage of the 2010 general election and the Labour leadership contest in a column written by Jesse Armstrong. The character is patterned on real-life government director of communications Alastair Campbell, as well as Hollywood producers such as Harvey Weinstein.
 Rt Hon Hugh Abbot MP (Chris Langham) – Series 1–2 – He is the Secretary of State for Social Affairs (later Social Affairs and Citizenship). He is an inept cabinet minister who is generally out of touch with the electorate. While he believes he has some influence, he often finds himself at the mercy of events and bearing the brunt of Tucker's vitriol. He reads the New Statesman and has two children, Alicia and Charlie, whom he barely sees. He is replaced by junior minister Nicola Murray in a reshuffle at the beginning of series 3 without appearing on screen.
 Rt Hon Nicola Murray MP (Rebecca Front) – Series 3–4 – Nicola replaces Hugh Abbot from series 3. She is promoted to Social Affairs and Citizenship Secretary as a last-minute choice in a government reshuffle in the run up to a general election. Inexperienced and naive, she begins her tenure poorly with a number of public embarrassments over her husband's career. She also finds it difficult to maintain a healthy balance between her home and work lives, conflicting with Tucker when he demands that she send her daughter to a state comprehensive school, rather than her preferred choice of a private school. Relatively powerless in the cabinet, her dour public image, largely encouraged by Tucker, leads her to be referred to as "glummy mummy". Although she and Tucker regularly clash, he is occasionally shown to be much more sympathetic towards her than to her predecessor, particularly when he suggests that the government might quietly accede to her wishes regarding her choice of school for her daughter "in a term or two". Though little improved as a political operator and unpopular within her party, Nicola is elected as leader of the opposition on a technicality before the start of Series 4, and is hounded throughout the series by calls for her to resign.
 Glenn Cullen (James Smith) – Series 1–4 – Glenn is senior special adviser to the minister. A long-standing friend of Hugh's since the campaign days, he acts as his chief adviser. He is generally politically adept, often being a voice of sense within the series, although due to his age is often ignored and emasculated by younger members of staff. Despite a number of mishaps, such as swearing at a member of the public who confronts Abbot, he keeps his job due to his loyalty to Hugh. Following Hugh's departure, he expects to retire, but is unexpectedly kept on as adviser to Nicola Murray. His home life is troubled, being divorced and with a disabled son. Originally intending to stand for parliament at the next election, his association with Nicola leads to him failing to receive enough support to become a prospective parliamentary candidate. He switches party following the election, and in series 4 stays on in DoSAC as an adviser to the junior minister, who is a junior partner in coalition government. Despite his generally unfortunate experiences, he is possibly the only major character to whom Malcolm shows any (if occasional) warmth; Tucker deliberately implied Glenn's usefulness after his mini-breakdown in "Spinners and Losers" and expresses what appears to be genuine remorse after punching Glenn in Series 3, Episode 3.
 Terri Coverley (Joanna Scanlan) – Series 1–4 – Terri acts as director of communications for the department. Notionally responsible for press relations at DoSAC, Coverley was head of press recruited from supermarket chain Waitrose as part of an ill-advised scheme to make government run like a business. Professional but prudish, she is often left to "mop up" the bad press garnered by the department. As a civil servant, compared with the MPs and advisers she is relatively safe in her job, a fact which she repeatedly states to their annoyance. She takes a leave of absence during series 2 due to the death of her father.
 Oliver "Ollie" Reeder (Chris Addison) – Series 1–4 – Ollie is a special adviser to the Secretary of State (formerly junior policy adviser). An Oxbridge graduate from Lincolnshire, he is arrogant, inept, inexperienced, somewhat gawky, and often inadvertently the cause of departmental mistakes. However, the minister often takes up his ideas believing them to be vote-winners. During series 1 it is revealed that he once had a relationship with journalist Angela Heaney (Lucinda Raikes) who makes occasional appearances through the first three series. He was seconded to the Prime Minister's Office after he slept with opposition party worker Emma Messinger (Olivia Poulet) and was told to use his relationship to gather information on opposition party policy. He is described by Terri as "a little bit morally bankrupt and massively self centred and a tiny bit dangerously unreliable". In series 4, he is an adviser to Nicola Murray in her capacity as leader of the opposition, but schemes with Malcolm to try and force her resignation. In the series conclusion, he takes over from Malcolm as his party's senior communications adviser.

Broadcast history 
The first run of three episodes screened on BBC Four from 19 May 2005. A further three episodes were transmitted 20 October – 3 November 2005. The six episodes were repeated on BBC Two in early 2006, and later on BBC America together as a single series. The subsequent DVD release of all six episodes describes the episodes as The Complete First Series.

An hour-long Christmas special, "The Rise of the Nutters", aired in January 2007 with a further ten episodes planned for later on in the year. Chris Langham did not reprise his role as Hugh Abbot, due to arrest and later conviction on charges of possession of child pornography, ruling him out of any further roles. To fill this void, Iannucci introduced new characters into the series forming the opposition.

Another one-off hour-long episode "Spinners and Losers" aired on 3 July 2007. It was followed by a 15-minute extra episode through BBC Red Button, following the same story from the opposition's point of view.

For series 3, transmission switched to BBC Two, with subsequent repeats on BBC Four. The series ran for eight episodes from 24 October 2009 to 12 December 2009. As a Red Button extra, each episode had an accompanying 10-minute documentary titled Out of The Thick of It broadcast immediately afterwards and on the BBC Comedy website, which featured cut scenes, specially written scenes and, later, discussion of the programme by the series' writers, makers and with figures involved in British politics.

Internationally, series 1 and 2 aired back-to-back in Australia on ABC1 each Friday at 9:40 pm from 21 November 2008 and has since been repeated on ABC2 and UKTV. Later, the two-hour-long specials along with series 3 premiered consecutively on the lower-rated ABC2 channel from 7 July 2011 each Thursday at 10:15 pm and again repeated, this time on ABC1 and UKTV.

A fourth series was commissioned in March 2010. Work began on the scripts in March 2011, filming began in March 2012 and airing started on BBC Two on 8 September 2012. The fourth series is co-produced by Hulu. Iannucci stated that the coalition government, in particular the role of the Liberal Democrats, would remain the target of the next series. In an interview with The Guardian, he stated his idea was for Peter Mannion to have become a minister "but there will be someone from the other party in the coalition in his office, so a lot of the comedy will come from that tension between duplicated ministers." Press for the fourth series partially focused on the applicability of the show to real life, with Will Smith commenting that the use of the word "omnishambles", coined in the third series, becoming a political meme in the months before transmission being a "baffling" example of life imitating art.

Ratings

Series 1

Series 2

Specials

Series 3 
No ratings available.

Series 4

Reception

Critical reception 
The Thick of It received critical acclaim during its original run. On Metacritic, the first series of the show holds a score of 90 out of 100 based on 4 reviews, indicating "[u]niversal acclaim". Entertainment Weekly gave the series a grade of A−, with reviewer Alynda Wheat calling the "sly Britcom [...] a C-SPAN spin-off of [...] The Office." Margy Rochlin in The New York Times described it as "urgently authentic. Visually, the series has a news-as-it-is-happening feel, where actors are often only half in the frame or partly obscured while reciting a line of dialogue. The cameras will skitter restlessly from character to character, sometimes bouncing so crazily that the result looks like a foot chase from "Cops."" The DVD of the first two series received a perfect score from the U.K.'s Empire magazine, with critic William Thomas calling it "the finest shot of pitch-black comic vitriol to be aimed at Whitehall in many a moon." A DVD of the post-series 2 specials also received a perfect score from Gary Andrews of Den of Geek, who wrote: "What makes The Thick Of It so watchable is the feeling that what you’re watching could well have happened at one point or another behind the scenes at Westminister. Even the minor characters are perfectly drawn and everybody gets at least one good line, with classic quotes popping up in virtually every line of dialogue. Yes Minister may have set the bar for political sitcoms but The Thick Of It adds gratuitous swearing and a group of utterly unlikeable yet immensely watchable characters."

The third series of the show has a Rotten Tomatoes score of 83% based on 6 reviews, with an average score of 10/10. The day its first episode aired, Caitlin Moran wrote an article for The Times  calling The Thick of It the "best show ever made" and a show that "has changed the way we see politics." Verne Gay of Newsday gave the series a highest possible grade of A+, calling it "[o]ne of the flat-out funniest half-hours of television in the English-speaking world." His review, published in 2012, posited that Ianucci's semi-spin-off of the show -- the U.S.-based Veep -- was a "pallid knockoff" compared to The Thick of It because of Capaldi's role as Malcolm Tucker in the latter, "a human blowtorch who doesn't merely dress down subordinates but rips their clothes off to pour sulfuric acid -- figuratively speaking, though barely -- on their still-smoldering skin." The A.V. Club's David Sims' retrospective assessment of the series was also mostly positive, though he opined that Malcolm's "thrilling" "fall from grace" towards the end was a bit rushed. In his review of the first episode, Michael Deacon of The Daily Telegraph felt that Tucker's character was "overdone", but admitted that this criticism was "silly" and "tantamount to saying the show's too funny." A negative review came from The Guardian, whose Michael White felt that the show "lacked heart, lacked sympathy, lacked good guys, let alone honest ambitions. In that sense it's the exact opposite of another highly professional show about politics, The West Wing. [...] But I can't stand The West Wing either: too sentimental, just as The Thick of It is much too cynical. I can see that it's funny, but I rarely laugh."

The fourth and final series of the show has a Rotten Tomatoes score of 88% based on 16 review, with an average score of 7.30/10. It is also the only series to have a critical consensus on the site, which reads: "Armando Ianucci's gloriously profane satire concludes at the peak of its dyspeptic hilarity, combining its withering eye for political machinations and its Shakespearean flow of curse words to deliver a harrowingly funny sendoff." James Poniewozik, writing for TIME, found that "the political specificity" of the show's situations "give it bite. And the way it draws its various characters gives it a kind of poignance for all its hard-hearted cynicism. Political satires like to depict pols as self-interested, cold professionals who have traded in their ideals, and that’s plenty true here. But Mannion and the various staffers are also simply imperfect people, fallen short of their ambitions and stuck in what are–for all the perks and access to power–often lousy, exhausting, crappy jobs, which grind them down and smother their personal lives." Anthony Paletta of New York magazine also wrote positively of the show's characterizations, noting their "genuine consciences" at various points. He also praised the show for its "startlingly versatile obscenity." A few critics, however, expressed reservations regarding the final series. Graeme Thornson of The Arts Desk, for example, felt that "[t]ime [had] rounded off some of the sharp edges" of the show, but conceded that "it still delivers a highly generous helping of belly laughs per minute." Sam Wollaston of The Guardian was more critical, writing: "There is an unsubtlety, a too-obviousness, about it that makes me wonder whether Armando Iannucci, what with all his other projects like [sic] taking over America and the world, had let his eye off this one."

Awards 
The series has been the recipient of a number of awards, particularly from the BAFTA. Series 1 won both "Best Situation Comedy"  and Chris Langham won "Best Comedy Performance" at the 2006 BAFTA Television Awards, with Peter Capaldi being nominated for the same award in 2006 and 2008. Capaldi won the BAFTA for "Best Male Comedy Performance" at the 2010 awards, with Rebecca Front winning "Best Female Comedy Performance". The series was also declared the "Best Situation Comedy". Additionally, the series won "Best Situation Comedy" from the Royal Television Society in 2006 and 2010, and won Broadcasting Press Guild Awards in 2006 and 2010 for "Best Sitcom" and "Best Writing Team".

Legacy 
The Thick of It has often been ranked as one of the greatest TV shows of all time. In 2019, The Guardian ranked it the 4th greatest show of the 21st century, with Phil Harrison writing that the "craven, idiotic likes of Peter Mannion and Nicola Murray would be paragons of probity and wisdom in today’s parliamentary landscape. But at the time, Armando Iannucci’s scabrous comedy felt like an indictment of everything wrong with the spin and cynicism of British politics." Empire included it at #81 on their list of "The 100 Best TV Shows Of All Time", calling it "one of the sharpest, fastest-witted comedies ever, skewering Britain's political class via a tornado of creative cursing." Digital Spy readers voted it the 66th greatest show of the 21st century. The following year, BBC Culture polled 206 "critics, journalists, academics and industry figures" from around the world to compile the 100 greatest television series of the 21st century; The Thick of It came in at #20. The website also selected it as one of 25 shows that defined the century, with Turkish film critic Ali Arikan writing:The early part of the new century was marked by a heinous trend of "new optimism" in US comedy, where spiritual redemption was available to even the least deserving. On the opposite end of the spectrum was The Thick of It, Armando Iannucci's caustic UK satire, the central premise of which was that everyone involved in government were contemptible halfwits interested purely in self-preservation. Showcasing ever more inventive ways in which powerless politicians and useless civil servants can create monumental crises out of molehills, the show made a star of Peter Capaldi (years after he had won an Oscar for a short film he directed), whose scathing spin doctor Malcolm Tucker frantically rampaged through Westminster like a foul-mouthed Godzilla. Any faith in politics was confidently and certainly rebuked.Many commentators have written about the show's continued relevance in the years following its final series. In 2016, NME publsihed an article titled "Eight Times Brexit Made British Politics Look Like The Thick Of It". The following year, Ianucci revived Malcolm Tucker for a 4-page Brexit debate against Alan Partridge (another character he'd co-created) for The Big Issue. Gavin Haynes wrote in Vice in 2019:Time and again, The Thick of It led and reality fell in behind. Eighteen months after “Do you know what it’s like to clean up your own mother’s piss?” we had The Gillian Duffy Incident. Nick Clegg used to bang on about "alarm clock Britain". Season four's Nicola Murray had her own target market: "the quiet bat-people". Murray's came first. The term "omnishambles", coined on the show in 2009, leapt from the screen into politics after George Osborne's flaky 2012 budget. By the following year, Malcolm Tucker's phrase had entered the OED.Adam Miller, writing for Herald Scotland, wrote that it has become a "cliche" to compare modern political developments to the show, noting: "rarely has a Tory story in the last few years not led to ‘The Thick of It’ trending on Twitter." Collider's Joe Hoeffner wrote in 2022: "Just as any vaguely dystopian technological development is compared to an episode of Black Mirror, people can’t help but wonder what Malcolm Tucker would have to say whenever someone in Whitehall makes a fool of themselves, which, in recent years, is more or less on a daily basis."

Spin-offs

In the Loop 

In May 2008, the BBC issued a press release stating that filming had commenced on a feature-length adaptation named In the Loop starring Tom Hollander, James Gandolfini, Chris Addison, Peter Capaldi, Gina McKee and Steve Coogan. The film followed the plight of the International Development minister as an inadvertent comment in an interview leads to him being used as a puppet by the president of the United States and the prime minister who are looking to launch a war in the Middle East. The film follows the officials and advisers in their behind-the-scenes efforts either to promote the war or prevent it.

Although many of the TV series cast returned, the only actual returning characters are Malcolm Tucker, Jamie McDonald and Sam Cassidy, with series regulars Chris Addison, James Smith, Joanna Scanlan, Alex MacQueen, Olivia Poulet, Eve Matheson and Will Smith playing new characters altogether. The film premiered in the US at the 2009 Sundance Film Festival and in the UK at the 2009 Glasgow Film Festival. It was released on 17 April 2009 in the United Kingdom.  In The Loop was nominated for an Academy Award for Best Adapted Screenplay in 2010. Several cast members later played similar roles in Veep.

U.S. remake (2007) 
On 27 October 2006, it was announced that The Thick of It would be adapted for American television, focusing on the daily lives of a low-level member of the United States Congress and his staff. Arrested Development creator Mitch Hurwitz would be the executive producer, along with Iannucci and Richard Day. The pilot was directed by Christopher Guest, and produced by Sony Pictures and BBC Worldwide. The cast included John Michael Higgins, Oliver Platt, Michael McKean, Alex Borstein, and Wayne Wilderson.

ABC did not pick up the show for its 2007 Autumn schedule. Iannucci distanced himself from the pilot, saying: "It was terrible ... they took the idea and chucked out all the style. It was all conventionally shot and there was no improvisation or swearing. It didn't get picked up, thank God." Other networks including HBO, Showtime, and NBC expressed interest in the show, and in April 2009, Iannucci re-entered talks with HBO over the possibility of an American adaptation.

Veep 

In November 2010 it was announced that HBO had ordered a pilot for a new series called Veep, to be written, directed and produced by Iannucci. It stars Julia Louis-Dreyfus in the leading role as vice president of the U.S. and also includes several of the American cast members who played similar characters in In the Loop, most notably series co-star Anna Chlumsky. The series began airing in April 2012. Although it is not a direct spin-off, Veep shares a similar tone and style with The Thick of It. Veep began showing in the UK on Sky Atlantic beginning in June 2012.
Justin Edwards and Rebecca Gethings appear in the Veep episode "Special Relationship" as different characters.

Media releases 
On 2 April 2007, a UK DVD of the first six episodes was released as "The Complete First Series". It also included audio commentary, deleted scenes, and photo galleries. The two specials were released on a second UK DVD in April 2009. The third series was released on UK DVD in April 2010, followed by a "complete series" to date box set. Although the third series was filmed and broadcast on the BBC in high definition video there has been no release to date on Blu-ray. A North American "Series One to Three" DVD box set was briefly scheduled for release in late 2012, but the release was delayed until 6 Aug. 2013, in order to allow all four seasons (plus specials) to be included in what was now a "Complete Series" release. The release date was announced by BBC Worldwide early in 2013, but coincidentally ended up occurring only two days after Peter Capaldi was announced as the new star of Doctor Who. (Even more coincidental, a cast commentary included as part of a photo gallery featurette for the episode "Rise of the Nutters" included in the DVD set, recorded several years earlier, has several cast members jokingly deciding to start a rumour that Capaldi is to be the next Doctor.)

Books and newspaper columns 
The Thick of It: The Scripts, a book containing the scripts from the first two series and the 2007 specials, was published on 1 September 2007.

A tie-in book, The Thick of It: The Missing DoSAC Files, was published on 4 November 2010.
An iPhone app – based on the DoSAC Files book and named 'Malcolm Tucker: The Missing Phone' – was released in 2010, and was nominated for a New Media award at the 2011 Television BAFTAs.

In the run-up to the 2010 general election, the column 'Malcolm Tucker's election briefing' appeared weekly in The Guardian, written by Jesse Armstrong.

A one-off column written by Ian Martin in the character of Stewart Pearson – 'Stewart Pearson's Media Notebook' – appeared in The Guardian in November 2010.

See also 
 Omnishambles
 Politics in fiction
 Political satire
 The Hollowmen

References

External links 

 
 
 
 
 

Videos
 The Thick of It Special – Armando Iannucci – BBC Four on BBC YouTube channel
 The Thick of It: Spinners and Losers – The Opposition – BBC Four on BBC YouTube channel

 
2005 British television series debuts
2012 British television series endings
2000s British political television series
2000s British satirical television series
2000s British sitcoms
2010s British political television series
2010s British satirical television series
2010s British sitcoms
BAFTA winners (television series)
BBC high definition shows
BBC television sitcoms
English-language television shows
Political satirical television series
Television shows adapted into films
Television shows set in London
Television series by BBC Studios
2000s British workplace comedy television series
2010s British workplace comedy television series
British political comedy television series
